Our Land may refer to:
Our Land (Italy), a political party in Italy
Our Land (Newspaper), a newspaper in Ukraine, founded in 1930
Our Land (Ukraine), a political party in Ukraine since 2011
Our Land (film), a 2006 film directed by Sergio Rubini
Tianxia, a Chinese word